Yuriy Gurin (born 7 May 1966 in Berezne, Ukrainian SSR) is a Soviet sprint canoeist who competed from the late 1980s to the early 1990s. He won ten medals at the ICF Canoe Sprint World Championships with seven golds (C-2 1000 m: 1987, C-4 500 m: 1989, 1990, 1991; C-4 1000 m: 1989, 1990, 1991), one silver (C-2 500 m: 1987), and two bronzes (C-2 1000 m: 1989, 1990).

References

Living people
Soviet male canoeists
1966 births
Ukrainian male canoeists
ICF Canoe Sprint World Championships medalists in Canadian
Honoured Masters of Sport of the USSR
Sportspeople from Rivne Oblast